The John Mark Three-Decker is a historic triple decker in Worcester, Massachusetts.  It is a rare example in the city of the form executed in brick.  It was built in 1888 by John Mark, a mason who also lived in the building.  The front door is sheltered by an overhang supported by heavy brackets, which extends over a first floor bay section to the doors right.  There are bands of decorative brickwork between the floors.

The building was listed on the National Register of Historic Places in 1990.

See also
National Register of Historic Places listings in southwestern Worcester, Massachusetts
National Register of Historic Places listings in Worcester County, Massachusetts

References

Apartment buildings in Worcester, Massachusetts
Apartment buildings on the National Register of Historic Places in Massachusetts
Italianate architecture in Massachusetts
Houses completed in 1888
National Register of Historic Places in Worcester, Massachusetts